Thomas Williams (September 9, 1896 – January 19, 1937) was a Negro leagues pitcher for several years before the founding of the first Negro National League, and in its first few seasons.

Williams attended Morris Brown College.

In 1917, 21 year-old Williams registered for the WWI draft. He lists his occupation as a "Professional Base Ball" Player for Rube Foster. He also lists his home address as 3664 Wabash Avenue in Chicago, Illinois. Williams is listed as married and lists his wife as a dependent.

In 1918, while playing for the Hilldale Club, Williams was drafted into the Army in Class 1-A.

He died in Bremen, Illinois in 1937 and is buried at Restvale Cemetery in Alsip, Illinois.

References

External links
 and Baseball-Reference Black Baseball stats and Seamheads

Bacharach Giants players
Brooklyn Royal Giants players
Chicago American Giants players
Detroit Stars players
Hilldale Club players
Lincoln Giants players
1896 births
1937 deaths
20th-century African-American sportspeople
Burials at Restvale Cemetery